Sir William Gibson Craig, 2nd Baronet,  PC, FRSE (2 August 1797 – 12 March 1878), was a Scottish advocate and politician, who held the important position of Lord Clerk Register for Scotland.

Life

He was born the first son of Sir James Gibson-Craig, 1st Baronet, and his wife, Anne Thomson. He was educated at the High School in Edinburgh and then privately in Yorkshire.

William became an advocate in 1820. He became a member of the Highland Society in 1824. In 1828 he was elected a Fellow of the Royal Society of Edinburgh his proposer being Thomas Allan.

He was the Member of Parliament for Midlothian representing the Whig party from 1837 to 1841 and for Edinburgh from 1841 to 1852. He was a Junior Lord of the Treasury in Lord John Russell's government from 1846 to 1852.

He was Lord Clerk Register and Keeper of the Signet from 1862 until his death. He was made a Privy Counsellor in 1863.

He lived in Riccarton House to the south-west of Edinburgh. This huge Gothic mansion was demolished in the 20th century and now serves as the Riccarton Campus serving Heriot Watt University.

Family

His younger brother, James Thomson Gibson-Craig WS (1799–1886) was also a Fellow of the Royal Society of Edinburgh.

He was married to Betsy Vivian. They had six children.

One of his grandchildren was the philanthropist Dorothy Brooke.

Publications

On Howard's Wheel Plough

References

External links
 
 

1797 births
1878 deaths
Members of the Faculty of Advocates
Members of the Parliament of the United Kingdom for Edinburgh constituencies
Baronets in the Baronetage of the United Kingdom
William
Members of the Privy Council of the United Kingdom
Whig (British political party) MPs for Scottish constituencies
UK MPs 1837–1841
UK MPs 1841–1847
UK MPs 1847–1852
19th-century Scottish people
Scottish knights
Paintings by Henry Raeburn